Joseph (Joe) Hayes (born November 12, 1945) is an American author and teller of stories mainly found in the folklore of the American Southwest.  Hayes was an early pioneer of bilingual Spanish/English storytelling.  Joe currently lives in Santa Fe, New Mexico.

Early life
Born in rural Western Pennsylvania not far from Pittsburgh, Joe was the youngest of five children, with two brothers and two sisters.  His father often told stories to the children.  Later, Joe would do the same for his children.  The family later moved west to Benson, a small town in Arizona. Spending his late childhood and adolescent years in Southern Arizona, Joe picked up the Spanish that would become an integral part of his storytelling and writing.

Education and Employment
In 1968, Joe graduated from the University of Arizona with a bachelor's degree in English.  He started teaching at Sunnyside High School<ref
name=benson/> in Tucson, Arizona.   Joe left teaching and was employed in mineral exploration work from 1972 to 1976, working all over the western U.S. as well as in Mexico and Spain.  He moved to Los Alamos, New Mexico, in 1976 and again taught English.   His interest in storytelling deepened, partly due to the early influence of his father, and he started to share the tales with a broader audience.  In 1979, he began to devote himself full-time to sharing stories.  He focuses on elementary school audiences, although his work appeals to a wide range of ages.  In 1989, he was designated a New Mexico Eminent Scholar by the New Mexico Commission on Higher Learning.  He is a guest lecturer at colleges and universities and delivered the commencement address at the Graduate School of Library and Information Science at the University of California, Los Angeles.  In 2001, he traveled to Cuba participate in a translation workshop sponsored by Writers of the Americas and developed his interest in Cuban and African folk tales there. For children and adults alike, Hayes' storytelling sessions outside the tepee at the Wheelwright Museum in Santa Fe were a summer tradition that has continued for over 40 years.

Works

Books
 A Heart Full of Turquoise, Mariposa Publishing, 1988
 Antonio's Lucky Day, Scholastic, 1993
 Coyote and the butterflies : a Pueblo Indian tale, Scholastic, 1993
 The Checker Playing Hound Dog, Mariposa Publishing, 1986
 Coyote &, Mariposa Publishing, 1983 
 The Day It Snowed Tortillas : tales from Spanish New Mexico, Mariposa Pub., 1985, c1982
 Dance, Nana, dance = Baila, Nana, baila : Cuban folktales in English and Spanish Cinco Puntos Press, 2008
 El Cucuy A Bogeyman Cuento, Cinco Puntos Press, 2001 Winner: New Mexico Land of Enchantment Award
 Everyone Knows Gato Pinto, Mariposa Publishing, 1992 
 Ghost Fever/Mal de fantasma, Cinco Puntos Press, 2004  Winner: Texas Bluebonnet Award 
 The Gum Chewing Rattler Cinco Puntos Press, 2006
 Juan Verdades The Man Who Couldn't Tell a Lie Orchard Scholastic Books, 2001  Nominated: New Mexico Land of Enchantment Award  Nominated: Texas Bluebonnet Award
 La Llorona/The Weeping Woman (Cinco Puntos, 1987)(Hard cover edition, Cinco Puntos Press, 2004) 
 Little Gold Star/Estrellita de oro Cinco Puntos Press, 2000
 Mariposa, Mariposa, Trails West, 1988
 Monday, Tuesday, Wednesday, Oh!/Lunes, Martes, Miécoles, (O!, Trails West, 1897
 No Way, José!/(De Ninguna Manera, José, Trails West, 1986
 Pájaro Verde/The Green Bird Cinco Puntos Press, 2002 Winner: American Folklore Society Aesop Award
 Soft Child, Harbinger House, 1993
 A Spoon for Every Bite, Orchard Books, 1994 
 Tell Me a Cuento/Cuéntame un story, Cinco Puntos Press, 1998 
 The Terrible Tragadabas/El Terrible Tragadabas, Trails West, 1987 
 Watch Out for Clever Women/Cuidado con las mujeres astutas, Cinco Puntos Press, 1994 
 The Wise Little Burro, Trails West, 1990 
 Where There's a Will, There's a Way/Donde hay ganas hay mañas, Trails West, 1995

Anthologies with Stories from Joe Hayes
 Best-Loved Stories Told at the National Storytelling Festival NAPPS, 1990
 More Best-Loved Stories Told at the National Storytelling Festival NAPPS, 1992 
 Five-minute tales : more stories to read and tell when time is short by Margaret Read MacDonald; August House Publishers, 2007

Editing or Translations by Joe Hayes
 Celebrate Martin Luther King, Jr. Day with Mrs. Park's class Alfaguara/Santillana USA Pub. Co., 2006 
 Celebrate a powwow with Sandy Starbright / F. Isabel Campoy & Alma Flor Ada ; illustrated by Maria Jesus Alvarez ; translated by Joe Hayes and Sharon Franco; Miami : Alfaguara/ Santillana USA, c2007.
 Celebrate Cinco de Mayo with the Mexican hat dance  Alfaguara/ Santillana US, 2006.
 Cuentos de cuanto hay-Tales from Spanish New Mexico/collected from the oral tradition,by J. Manuel Espinosa;University of New Mexico Press, 1998.
 Celebrate Kwanzaa with Boots and her kittens  Alfaguara/ Santillana USA
 Modelo antiguo : a novel of Mexico City; Cinco Pintos Press, 1997

Quotes

I feel like my bilingual approach to storytelling has helped Spanish-speaking children feel proud of their heritage and at the same time has helped non-Hispanic children open up to and appreciate the Spanish language and Hispanic culture," wrote Hayes, a native of Pennsylvania and current New Mexico resident, in an email. "I think it's really important that my own heritage is not Hispanic. It defuses the 'us and them' way of looking at language. For Hispanic kids I'm one of 'them' honoring 'our' language, and for non-Hispanic kids it's one of 'us' honoring 'their' language. Barriers are lowered; rigid attitudes are softened; a better sense of community is fostered."

Someone has said that enemies are just people whose stories we don't know. I see a lot of truth in that. The more other people's stories are hidden from us, the easier it is for us to view them as enemies. But, when we begin to learn their stories, we recognize all we share in common with them and we delight in how the unique beauty of their traditions enriches our own lives.

Awards and Accolades
 1989 New Mexico Eminent Scholar by the New Mexico Commission on Higher Learning
 1995 New Mexico Governor's Award for Excellence and Achievement in the Arts
 1995 Southwest Book Award Border Regional Library Association – Watch Out for Clever Women/Cuidado con las mujeres astutas
 1995 Children's Author Award, Arizona Library Assoc. the  Soft Child: How the Rattlesnake Got Its Fangs 
 1996 Arizona Young Readers Award – Picture Book: Soft Child: How the Rattlesnake Got Its Fangs by Joe Hayes
 2001 Land of Enchantment Children's Book Award – A Spoon for Every Bite
 2002 IPPY Awards – Children's Picture Book (7 & over) Winner: !El Cucuy! by Joe Hayes; illus. Honorio Robledo (Cinco Puntos Press) 
 2003 IPPY Award Multicultural Fiction – Juv/Young Adult Winner: Pájaro Verde (The Green Bird) by Joe Hayes; illus by Antonio Castro L. (Cinco Puntos Press)
 2003 Aesop Accolade Award – Pajaro Verde: The Green Bird. By Joe Hayes, illustrated by Antonio Castro L. El Paso, TX: Cinco Puntos, 2002.
 2005 Talking Leaves Literary Oracle Award – National Storytelling Network
 2005 Land of Enchantment Children's Book Award – El Cucuy
 2005 Latino Book Awards: Best Children's Picture Book – Bilingual (Tie) La Llorona; Author: Joe Hayes Illustrator: Vicki Trego Hill & Mona Pennypacker Publisher: Cinco Puntos Press
 2005 IPPY Award Story Teller of the Year  Joe Hayes, author of Ghost Fever (Mal de Fantasma)and La Llorona (The Weeping Woman) (Cinco Puntos Press)
 2007 Texas Bluebonnet Award – Ghost Fever (First Bilingual book to win the prize)<ref
name="Ghost"/>
 2009 Anne Izard Storytellers' Choice Awards – Dance, Nana, Dance/Baila, Nana, Baila: Cuban Folktales in English and Spanish (Cinco Puntos Press)

References

Living people
American children's writers
1945 births
University of Arizona alumni
American storytellers
American performance artists
Writers from Pennsylvania
Writers from Arizona
People from Benson, Arizona